Leah Callahan (born June 20, 1987) is a female freestyle wrestler from Canada. Callahan was born in St. John's, Newfoundland and Labrador, grew up in Mackenzie, British Columbia, and currently resides in Calgary, Alberta. In 2012, Callahan won the gold medal at the Pan American Qualification tournament and thus qualified to compete at the 2012 Summer Olympics.  At the 2012 Summer Olympics, she lost in the second round to Ochirbatyn Burmaa.

Callahan is the subject of an interactive documentary film called The Sticking Place, released on June 27, 2012.

References

External links
 

1987 births
Living people
Canadian female sport wrestlers
Olympic wrestlers of Canada
People from the Regional District of Fraser-Fort George
Sportspeople from British Columbia
Sportspeople from St. John's, Newfoundland and Labrador
Wrestlers at the 2012 Summer Olympics
21st-century Canadian women